The Tahir Kheli (also Tar Kheli) is a Pashtun tribe which mainly dwells in the Hazara region of the Khyber Pakhtunkhwa province of Pakistan.

See also
 Tahir Kheli Pashtun people
 Hazara people

Yusufzai Pashtun tribes
Surnames